Psamatodes is a genus of moths in the family Geometridae erected by Achille Guenée in 1857.

Species
Psamatodes pallidata (Warren, 1897)
Psamatodes atrimacularia (Barnes & McDunnough, 1913)
Psamatodes pernicata (Guenée, 1857)
Psamatodes nigropunctata (Warren, 1897)
Psamatodes rectilineata (Warren, 1900)
Psamatodes rimosata Guenée, 1857
Psamatodes subdiversa (Warren, 1897)
Psamatodes ramparia (Schaus)
Psamatodes limbularia (Hübner)
Psamatodes memor (Dognin)
Psamatodes imitatrix (Thierry-Mieg)
Psamatodes doriteata (Guenée)
Psamatodes abydata (Guenée, 1857)
Psamatodes trientata (Herrich-Schäffer, 1870)
Psamatodes everiata (Guenée, 1857)
Psamatodes paleolata Guenée, [1858]
Psamatodes armigerata (Guenée)
Psamatodes delauta (Felder)
Psamatodes irrufata (Guenée)
Psamatodes pandaria (Schaus)

References

Geometridae